Los Mártires (Spanish for "The Martyrs") is the 14th locality of Bogotá, capital of Colombia. It is located near the city's downtown to its west. This district is mostly inhabited by lower middle and working class residents. It takes its name in honor of those who died during the war for independence from Spain. It is completely urbanized, save for its parks and the banks of its rivers.

General information

Borders
 North: Diagonal 22 and Avenida El Dorado, with the locality of Teusaquillo
 South: Calle 8 Sur and Avenida Primera, with the locality of Antonio Nariño
 East: Avenida Caracas, with the locality of Santa Fe
 West: Carrera 30 with the locality of Puente Aranda

Hydrology 
The Fucha River runs through the locality.

Topography 
Los Mártires is relatively flat due to its location on the Bogotá savanna. It slopes slightly upward to the west.

Transportation 
The locality is served by the Avenida Caracas and Calle 13 lines of the TransMilenio system, including the Avenida Jiménez transfer station.

History 

In the area that is now Los Mártires Park Policarpa Salavarrieta, María Antonia Santos Plata, Mercedes Ábrego, Camilo Torres Tenorio, and Antonio José de Caldas died. In 1850, an obelisk was erected in their memory.

Neighborhoods 
The following neighborhoods form part of the locality: Santa Isabel, Ciudad Montes, Eduardo Santos and Paloquemao

References

External links 
 
  National University of Colombia site about Los Mártires

Localities of Bogotá